Joseph Jackson (26 November 1874 – 23 August 1961) was an Australian politician and a member of the New South Wales Legislative Assembly from 1922 until 1956. He was variously a Nationalist, United Australia Party, Independent and Liberal member of parliament .

Early life and career
Jackson was born in Wellington, New South Wales and educated to elementary level in rural state schools. His father was an alluvial gold prospector and Jackson worked in rural occupations until he founded a substantial retail business at the Peak Hill gold rush after 1889. He moved to Sydney in 1904 and established a chain of retail stores. Jackson purchased Faulconbridge, the home of Sir Henry Parkes and donated a large tract of land (Jackson Park) to form a Prime Ministers' Corridor of Oaks. Jackson was a noted collector of Australiana. He was awarded an OBE in 1957. Jackson was an alderman on Sydney City Council in 1918 – 1922, 1924–1927 and 1930–1935. He was the Lord Mayor of Sydney in 1931 representing the Civic Reform Association.

State parliament
After an unsuccessful attempt in 1920, he was elected to the New South Wales Parliament as a Nationalist party member for the multi-member seat of Sydney at the 1922 state election. He retained the seat at the next two elections and successfully contested the seat of Nepean when the NSW electoral system reverted to single member seats at the 1927 election.  He retained Nepean as a Nationalist (1927–1932) and United Australia (1931–1944)member. He described himself as a "Liberal Nationalist" at the 1944 election. He was a foundation member of the Liberal Party in 1945.

Government
Jackson was the Minister for Local Government in the Stevens government for a short period in 1932–3. He retired from the parliament at the 1956 election

References

 

1874 births
1956 deaths
Civic Reform Association politicians
Liberal Party of Australia members of the Parliament of New South Wales
Members of the New South Wales Legislative Assembly